Fred Li Wah-ming  (Chinese: 李華明; born 25 April 1955, Hong Kong) is a former member of the Legislative Council of Hong Kong representing the constituency of Kowloon East. He was a member of the Kwun Tong District Council for Tsui Ping.

He was a social worker before being a legislator. He is a member of the Hong Kong Democratic Party.

Views, policy positions and Legco voting
In June 2010, he voted with the party in favour of the government's 2012 constitutional reform package, which included the late amendment by the Democratic Party – accepted by the Beijing government – to hold a popular vote for five new District Council functional constituencies.

Citations

References
 Members' Biographies

External links
 Fred Li's biodata

1955 births
Living people
District councillors of Kwun Tong District
Hong Kong social workers
Charter 08 signatories
Democratic Party (Hong Kong) politicians
Meeting Point politicians
Members of the Urban Council of Hong Kong
HK LegCo Members 1991–1995
HK LegCo Members 1995–1997
HK LegCo Members 1998–2000
HK LegCo Members 2000–2004
HK LegCo Members 2004–2008
HK LegCo Members 2008–2012
Recipients of the Silver Bauhinia Star